Tortilla Mexican Grill PLC (branded as Tortilla) is a fast-food Mexican restaurant chain based out of United Kingdom, founded by Brandon and Jennifer Stephens in 2007 at London.

As of October 2022, it has 84 branches in the UK. Internationally, Tortilla operates in the Middle East, with 10 stores in Dubai and Saudi Arabia through an exclusive franchise partnership with Eathos.

History 
The first Tortilla restaurant opened in Islington in 2007, Tortilla became the UK’s largest fast-food Mexican brand. Tortilla offers dine in, self-serve, take away, click and collect, and delivery.

This was supported by a steady expansion across the UK, 10 sites in Dubai and Saudi Arabia, cloud kitchen estate and exclusive delivery partnership with Deliveroo.

In 2019, Tortilla expanded its footprint to include some of the UK’s most prominent travel hubs, including the Euston railway station, through a partnership with SSP Group. In October 2021, Tortilla announced the launch of two new sites in Gatwick Airport and Leeds Skelton Lake Services.

In May 2021, Tortilla opened a site in Chessington World of Adventures Resort, through a partnership with Merlin Entertainments.

Over the years, Tortilla won several industry awards, including:

 QSR Media UK Centegra Awards 2020 - Best Marketing Campaign
 Restaurant Marketer & Innovator 2020 - 30 under 30
 R200: Best Value Restaurant Chain Over 20 Sites 2018
 FEJ Awards 2018 Operator of the year, best new kitchen concept
In May 2022, Tortilla announced it has acquired the Mexican restaurant chain Chilango Ltd from the investment company RDCP Group Ltd., for £2.8 million.

Values 

The brand only uses grass-fed British Isle brisket in its slow-cooked Barbacoa, as well as Red Tractor approved pork, and is a signatory of the Better Chicken Commitment. Meanwhile all vegetarian and vegan dishes are Vegan & Vegetarian Society approved.

In January 2021, to aid youth employment, Tortilla has offered 50 new placements as part of the Government’s Kickstart Scheme.

References

2007 establishments in England
British brands
Companies listed on the London Stock Exchange
Fast-food chains of the United Kingdom
British companies established in 2007
Restaurants established in 2007